The  (also called  and ) is a mini MPV with sliding doors designed and manufactured by Daihatsu, and sold by Daihatsu, Toyota and Subaru. It is a five-seat MPV based on the M700 series Boon and was introduced on 9 November 2016 as the successor to the Coo. It sits below the Sienta in Toyota's minivan line-up.

The Thor is currently sold only in Japan, where is not regarded as a kei car due to the exterior dimensions as defined by Japanese government dimension regulations and the engine displacement of 996 cc, which incurs a modest annual road tax obligation. The Tank was once exclusive to Toyopet Store and Netz Store, while the Roomy was once exclusive to Toyota Store and Corolla Store.

The Thor and Roomy received a facelift on 15 September 2020, along with the discontinuation of Tank model due to integration of Japanese Toyota dealers. It is followed by the facelifted Justy in 24 September (the Custom model being discontinued).

For the pre-facelift models, the regular Thor shared its front bumper shape with the Tank (both regular and Custom models) and the Justy Custom (with a redesigned upper grille and cross-hatched lower grille). The Thor Custom's bumper shape is shared with the Roomy (both regular and Custom models) and the regular Justy (with black grille slats instead of chrome). The Roomy uses standard taillights, while the Tank uses clear lens lights, which are reserved for the Custom versions of Thor and Justy. All Custom versions also wear an additional front splitter and chrome rear bootlid trim.

The facelifted regular Thor shared its front styling with the regular Roomy, while the Thor Custom is shared with the Roomy Custom and the Justy.

Gallery

Thor 
Pre-facelift

Facelift

Roomy/Tank 
Pre-facelift

Facelift

Justy 
Pre-facelift

Facelift

References

External links 

  (Thor)
  (Roomy)
  (Justy)

Thor
Cars introduced in 2016
2020s cars
Mini MPVs
Front-wheel-drive vehicles
All-wheel-drive vehicles
Vehicles with CVT transmission